Toyota Motor Manufacturing Indiana (TMMI) is an automobile manufacturing factory located in Gibson County, Indiana, nearly halfway between Princeton and Fort Branch, and mostly in Union Township. It is a subsidiary of Toyota Motor North America, itself a subsidiary of Toyota Motor Corporation of Japan. With over 7,000 employees, TMMI is the largest employer in the Evansville Area.

History 
Toyota Motor Manufacturing Indiana was built in May 1996 to begin production of a full-size pickup truck solely for the North American market. TMMI began production of the Tundra in 1999 for the 2000 model year, and Sequoia production began a year later for 2001. Both the Tundra and the Sequoia were new to the market and have only been sold in North America; the Tundra replaced the Toyota T100 in the US market.

In 2003, production of the Sienna minivan shifted to TMMI for the release of its redesigned 2004 model, while Toyota Motor Manufacturing Kentucky produced the Solara in place of the Sienna.

On July 10, 2008, Toyota announced that they would consolidate Tundra production at Toyota Motor Manufacturing Texas in San Antonio after 2008. Owing to the large unsold supply of Tundras and Sequoias, production of both Tundras and Sequoias would be suspended. Toyota also announced that production of the Highlander would be shifted to TMMI and would start in 2009. Production of the Sequoia later resumed, although at a reduced output.

Layout 
The roughly 950,000 square foot factory is split into two different plants. The original factory, "West Plant," produces Highlanders and Sequoias. TMMI later expanded to add "East Plant" which produces Siennas. Both plants have joined weld, stamping, and plastic production sections. East Plant also started producing Highlanders as of 2016. Both plants have undergone large expansions to support the high domestic and worldwide demands for the Highlander.

TMMI is the sole source of Highlanders for all markets worldwide except China. Chinese-market Highlanders are made in China exclusively for the Chinese market.

Present automobiles produced 
Toyota Sienna (2003–present) (East)
Toyota Highlander (2009–present) (West and East)

Future automobiles 
Toyota Grand Highlander (from 2023)

Past automobiles produced 
Toyota Tundra (1999–2008), production moved to Toyota Motor Manufacturing Texas
Toyota Sequoia (2000–2021), production moved to Toyota Motor Manufacturing Texas

See also 
 List of Toyota manufacturing facilities
 Toyota Motor Engineering & Manufacturing North America
 Toyota Motor Manufacturing Kentucky

References 

Toyota factories
Motor vehicle assembly plants in Indiana
Princeton, Indiana
Fort Branch, Indiana
Buildings and structures in Gibson County, Indiana